The grey-headed sunbird (Deleornis axillaris) is a small passerine bird which breeds in mixed forest in the Democratic Republic of the Congo and western Uganda.

This sunbird is sometimes treated as a subspecies of Fraser's sunbird, Deleornis fraseri, but is not known to intergrade. Both taxa are sometimes placed in Anthreptes.

References

grey-headed sunbird
Birds of Central Africa
grey-headed sunbird